Heho Airport  is an airport serving Heho, a town in Kalaw Township, Taunggyi District, Shan State, Myanmar.  It is the main airport serving Inle Lake and Taunggyi the former of the top tourist destinations of Myanmar.

History
The airport served as an airbase both for the Allies and the Japanese during World War II. The airbase was heavily bombed by the Allies. Evidence of aircraft bunker revetments and bomb craters can still be seen on the southern end of the airfield, especially noticeable from the air.

Facilities
It was recently expanded to accommodate jet aircraft.

Airlines and destinations

Accidents and incidents
 On 25 December 2012, Air Bagan Flight 11, crashed short of the runway at Heho Airport. One passenger on board the aircraft plus one person on the ground were killed in the accident.
 On 21 June 1987, a Myanmar Airways Fokker F-27 Friendship 200 crashed into a mountain soon after take-off from Heho Airport, killing all 45 people on board.
 11 October 1987, a Burma Airways Fokker F-27 Friendship 500 crashed into a 1500 feet high mountain, killing all 49 people on board. This was Myanmar's second-deadliest air disaster, surpassed only by the crash of a Myanmar Air Force Shaanxi Y-8 in 2017, which killed 122 people. Thirty-six foreigners—14 Americans, seven Swiss citizens, five Britons, four Australians, three West Germans, two French citizens and one Thai—were among the dead.

References

External links

 

Airports in Myanmar
Shan State